This page combines data from a dozen written reference books about Australian heritage gardens, from 200 years of garden heritage. Private gardens have been excluded from the list.

2017 Bicentennial celebrations 

Bicentennial celebrations were held at Woolmers, Tasmania, and the National Rose Garden in 2017. Both the Australian Heritage Register, Australian States (e.g. NSW, VIC) and the National Trust of Australia protect heritage gardens and trees, but Local Authorities normally only list and protect built properties rather than their heritage-listed gardens alone. The National Trust of Tasmania does not maintain a publicly available list of registered properties. 

Similarly, the Tasmanian Heritage Register is constructed just of addresses, rather than with the discernible reason why a property is heritage listed. An enquirer must apply directly to the THR office for the heritage document for each address,

The Tasmanian Heritage Register is being deliberately reduced in size, and currently over 500 Hobart locations are due for heritage removal. Similar heritage lists include the List of historic homesteads in Australia, the Inventory of Gardens and Designed Landscapes in Scotland, and The National Trust for Places of Historic Interest or Natural Beauty in the UK.

Index of heritage and renowned Australian gardens

Heritage gardens of the Australian Capital Territory

Heritage and renowned gardens of New South Wales

Heritage Gardens in the Northern Territory

Heritage gardens of Queensland

Heritage gardens in South Australia

Heritage gardens in Tasmania

Heritage and renowned gardens in Victoria

Heritage gardens in Western Australia

Index Sources – 13 reference books summarised below.

Index source references

References

Notes

Lists of gardens
Gardens in Australia
Lists of tourist attractions in Australia